Webedia is a global company specializing in online media, a subsidiary of the Fimalac group. Based in France, its head office is at located 2 rue Paul Vaillant-Couturier in Levallois-Perret, France. Its founders are Cédric Siré and Guillaume Multrier.

Present in more than twenty countries, Webedia gathers more than 276 million unique monthly visitors in the world (according to Comscore in December 2019).

The company operates the following websites:

 in France: AlloCiné, Jeuxvideo.com, MGG, Puremédias, Purepeople, Pureshopping, Purebreak, Terrafemina, 750g, easyVoyage, etc.
 in Brazil: Adorocinema, Tudo Gostoso and Minhavida
 in Germany: Filmstarts, Moviepilot and GameStar
 in Spain and Latin America: Xataka, SensaCine and Raiser Games
 in Poland: Gry-Online and GetHero.

In 2019, the Webedia group estimated its workforce at 2,400 employees.

History 
Webedia was created in France in 2007, following the successive launches of the Purepeople, Puretrend and Purefans websites.

In December 2008, Webedia bought the comparison shopping website Shopoon (which was launched in May 2006 by La Redoute.) The Shopoon site was subsequently renamed as Pureshopping.

In January 2011, Webedia bought the website Ozap from M6 group which was a site specializing in media news. Following this acquisition Ozap was renamed Puremédias.

Webedia was acquired by Fimalac in May 2013. Following this takeover, it became Fimalac's subsidiary specializing in Internet media. In July 2013, Fimalac acquired AlloCiné for 67 million euros. The websites Newsring and Youmag websites were then purchased by Fimalac in November 2013. In December 2013, the cooking website 750g and the cultural platform Exponaute became the property of the group.

The company made several further acquisitions in 2014. OverBlog was acquired in April 2014 by Webedia for an unknown amount. In June, the company became the owner of Jeuxvideo.com through L'Odyssée Interactive, for 90 million euros in cash. In July that year, Webedia bought the German company Moviepilot for 13 million euros. In November, Webedia acquired the French company Gameo Consulting, owner of Millenium, a site specializing in electronic sports. In December 2014, Webedia announced a license agreement with Ziff Davis to launch sites under the IGN franchise in Brazil and France at the beginning of 2015. The French version of IGN was launched on 2, it targets the general public and casual gamers.

At the end of January 2015, it was announced that Webedia wanted to move the Jeuxvideo.com office to Paris in the building which brings together its other thematic websites, by offering the 47 employees to leave the head office of Aurillac against a compensation. According to site management, 17 to 18 employees declined the offer and were made redundant.

In February 2015, Webedia acquired Côté Ciné Group. The company provides movie theaters with technological solutions, and publishes specialized press magazines for the movie industry professionals (BoxOffice Pro in the United States and Côté Ciné in France).

On June 4, 2015, Webedia announced the acquisition of the Easyvoyage group, specializing in online travel comparators (Easyvol, Alibabuy) for a 57% capital acquisition by the end of summer 2015. In September 2015, the group acquires Mixicom, a company which operates the website JeuxActu, as well as a multi-channel network to which the youtubers Norman, Cyprien, Squeezie, Hugo Dessioux, Natoo and Wankil Studio (Laink and Terracid) are notably affiliated. Webedia also acquires 50% of the Brazilian network Paramaker. In December 2015, Webedia announced the acquisition of West World Media, an American digital marketing company specializing in the film industry.

In January 2016, Webedia bought the mobile video game studio Scimob, based in Montpellier, which notably developed the game 94%. On May 19, 2016, Webedia announced the acquisition of Surprizemi, a company specializing in the manufacture of home-delivered surprise boxes, founded in 2013 by Julien Radic and Maxime Lemarchand. On June 6, the group also acquired Eklablog, a site specializing in blogging. On October 4, 2016, Webedia announced the acquisition of Oxent, the company that organizes the eSports World Convention (notably on the occasion of Paris Games Week) and also of Bang Bang Management, a company that manages the image and communication of several figures of electronic sport (Domingo, Bruce Grannec ...). In addition, an agreement is made with Paris Saint-Germain for Webedia to recruit and manage e-sports players on behalf of Paris Saint-Germain eSports.

On November 15, 2016, the LFP announced that it had reached an agreement with beIN Sports and Webedia for the broadcasting of the first edition of the e-League 1. The competition is renewed for two additional seasons on July 26, 2017, the broadcasting agreements are renewed. On December 8, 2016, Webedia joined forces with Chronopost to launch Pourdebon, a home delivery service that connects Internet users and labeled producers (AOC, organic AB, etc.). Webedia has a slight majority (53%) in this new platform.

On January 19, 2017, Webedia announced the acquisition of the English company Peach Digital, specializing in web development and digital marketing for movie theaters. In February 2017, Le Figaro announced that Webedia had invested 10 million euros in Illico Fresco, a home delivery service for baskets of recipes. The same month, FDJ and Webedia announced a partnership for the creation of eSports competitions: a professional one (FDJ Masters League) and another one for amateur gamers (FDJ Open Series) starting in March 2017. They are broadcast on Webedia's Web TV. At the end of February 2017, the media group finalized the acquisition of MyPoseo, a SaaS publisher specialized on SEO analytics. On March 8, 2017, Webedia launched LeStream, a Twitch Web TV dedicated to video games, the result of two years of development, in the company of several YouTubers including Cyprien and Squeezie,.

On March 29, 2017, Webedia bought the Brazilian web publisher Minha Vida, a website devoted to health, nutrition, beauty and fitness, which attracts 14.3 million unique monthly visitors. Webedia reaches 44 million unique visitors in Brazil, and thus becomes the leading publisher on entertainment themes.

In June 2017, the company made its largest international acquisition, with the American agency 3BlackDot, specializing in talent management for video games. The agency, based in Los Angeles, manages 36 YouTubers followed by millions of subscribers on their channels which total 700 million videos viewed per month. In July 2017, Webedia bought IDZ, an audiovisual production company, and thus strengthened its production activities and its leadership on the YouTube channel networks in France.

That year, Webedia was the first French media group to use the measurement of their global audiences by Comscore. It represents deduplicated coverage on desktops, laptops, smartphones and tablets, and includes audiences for websites, mobile applications and videos. This new measure allows Webedia to establish a deduplicated global audience of 177 million unique visitors in April 2017.

In October 2017, Webedia announced its intention to launch a TV channel dedicated to electronic sports, called ES1. It remains subject to the approval of the CSA. The channel, which will offer magazines, game play sessions with esports champions, live or rebroadcast competitions, exclusive documentaries etc. is initially scheduled for December 1, 2017 but the CSA is delaying the launch of the channel due in particular to the non- official recognition of esports as a sport. The channel was finally officially launched on January 10, 2018, on Orange TV and on February 6, 2018, on Free and Bouygues Telecom.

In November 2017, Webedia, with the support of CDC International Capital, entered into exclusive negotiations with the Saudi company Uturn Entertainment, specializing in online entertainment, particularly on YouTube, and the production of digital content for the region's youth, with a view to merging it with Diwanee, a Webedia subsidiary in the Middle East, for an amount close to $100 million.

In December 2017, Webedia acquired a majority stake in the United Statesbased company called Creators Media, which brings together social and video production platforms specializing in popular culture and entertainment. That same month, Webedia joined forces with Elephant, Emmanuel Chain's audiovisual production company, to create a new content production label aimed at Millennials.

In January 2018, Webedia launched a sports marketing agency: Only Sports & Passions. That same month, Illico Fresco, specialist in the delivery of kit meals belonging to Webedia, joined forces with Weight Watchers, the world leader in slimming products.

In April 2018, Webedia published new audience figures in partnership with Comscore, 188 million unique monthly visitors in December 2017, an increase of 6.2% compared to the previous measure dating from April 2017.

The same month, Webedia unveils its ambitions concerning content production, as a partnership with the video game studio Focus Home Interactive is signed with a title "Fear the Wolves" already planned for 2018, co-production projects of films, cartoons or series are announced.

In July 2018, Webedia bought the American authors company Full Fathom Five, a company that helps authors produce books, TV series, films and video games.

In October 2018, Webedia announced that it was focusing on both esports clubs PSG Esports and LeStream Esport. The first one being geared towards international competitions and the second devoted mainly to the French esports scene. The "Millenium" brand is thus refocusing around its media activities and esports merchandising products, and the "Millenium esport club" being gradually closed. The same month, the company announced the acquisition of Weblogs, a Spanish-speaking website publisher, thereby strengthening its activity in Spain and Latin America.

On October 22, 2018, Webedia announced the merger of BoxOffice magazine with Film Journal International.

On November 13, 2018, Groupe SEB announced the acquisition from Webedia of 750g International, the international branch of the French recipe site 750g (the original French website 750g.com being retained by Webedia). The group is thus separating from Gourmandize (United States and United Kingdom), HeimGourmet (Germany), Rebañando (Spain), Receitas Sem Fronteiras (Brazil / Portugal) and Tribù Golosa (Italy).

The same month, Webedia joined forces with Riot Games to launch the French League of League of Legends (LFL), the first French professional league on the League of Legends game, which will bring together the 8 best teams on the French scene.

In March 2019, Webedia bought 51% of the audiovisual production company Elephant. The desire of the two groups is to create content  series, documentaries, magazines  for paid streaming platforms, television and social networks. Despite this takeover, Elephant's editorial independence is guaranteed. The new set will weigh 500 million euros, a quarter of which will be made outside France.

The same month, Webedia takes a majority stake in the company Partoo, which publishes a SaaS platform specializing in local marketing for brands and merchants (referencing of points of sale, their opening hours and pictures on all social networks, management of customers ratings and comments...).

On March 14, 2019, a new measurement of the international audience of Webedia sites was produced by Comscore, posting 250 million unique visitors in December 2018, up 9.2% compared to December 2017.

In May 2019, Marc Ladreit de Lacharrière announced that Webedia's objective is to double its turnover over the next five years.

In June 2019, the group joined forces with Michel Cymes, a famous doctor and French TV host by taking a majority stake in his company Club Santé Débat, in order to develop a health platform around the Dr. Good! Brand.

In September 2019, Webedia regrouped its cinematographic activities under the brand The Boxoffice Company. This new subsidiary then consisted of AlloCiné and its various international versions (Spain, Germany, Brazil, Turkey), as well as Côté Ciné Group (including the BoxOffice publications in the United States and its variation in France), WestWorldMedia (United States) and Peach Digital (United Kingdom) for marketing, database and business intelligence services for film professionals.

In November 2019, the French YouTuber Michou joined the network of talents and influencers managed by Webedia.

On November 14, 2019, the movie Queen and Slim starring Daniel Kaluuya and Jodie Turner-Smith, co-produced by Webedia through its subsidiary 3BlackDot and distributed by Universal Pictures, was released in the United States. It grossed a total $47 million revenue worldwide.

In December 2019, Webedia announced the distribution of its ES1 channel dedicated to esport in Quebec in partnership with Thema (Canal+ group), then in January 2020 the distribution in France of the ES1 channel within the Canal+ offers.

On April 20, 2020, Webedia published a new measurement of the international audiences of its sites with Comscore, with 276 million unique monthly visitors measured in December 2019, an increase of 10.4% over one year.

In July 2020, Webedia announced that its ES1 TV channel brought together more than 1.3 million viewers in France. On July 28, 2020, the French League of League of Legends (LFL) produced by Webedia resumes service in a format adapted to the health crisis, with a final happening in Monaco on October 26, 2020.

In September 2020, the international tennis player Gael Monfils and Paralympic swimmer Théo Curin join the portfolio of esports and sports talents managed by Webedia for their digital communication.

In October 2020, the 750g and Millenium sites announced an overhaul of their positioning and graphic identities. Millenium becomes MGG and develops in 5 international versions.

On October 4, 2020, Webedia and Banijay Iberia launched "Top Gamers Academy" in Spain, the first TV reality show in the world of video games. This program, which brings together the greatest Spanish YouTubers (El Rubius, The Grefg ...) is broadcast on the Spanish channel Neox and on social and video networks, in particular on Twitch and YouTube.

On November 16, 2020, Webedia joined forces with Jamy Gourmaud to create a new editorial brand around knowledge, called Epicurieux. The brand is available on social and video networks (Facebook, Instagram, YouTube, Snapchat) and contributes to a television program broadcast on France 5, produced by Elephant (Webedia group) and presented by Jamy Gourmaud, "C Jamy".

In December 2020, ES1 announces its arrival in France on Amazon's Prime Video service.

On January 19, 2021, the French League of League of Legends (LFL) produced by Webedia resumed for a third season.

In March 2021, Webedia brought together all of its new talent management labels under the Webedia Creators umbrella, and announcedthe arrival of the Tiktokers group "La French House" among its creators, as well as the company Smile Conseil (notably representing the influencer Just Riadh).

In May 2021, Webedia reinvested 15 million euros in its subsidiary Partoo, of which the group is the majority shareholder, in order to enable it to achieve a new stage in its international development.

In June 2021, Jeuxvideo.com becomes "JV".

In July 2021, Webedia and easyGroup announced a strategic partnership whereby the easyVoyage site and its variations, owned by Webedia, adopt the identity of the "easy" family of brands.

Activities 
Webedia is present in around twenty countries: France, Germany, Spain, Brazil, Mexico, Argentina, Chile, Colombia, United States, United Kingdom, Poland, Turkey, Lebanon, United Arab Emirates, Saudi Arabia, Morocco, Tunisia, Singapore. Brazil is the group's leading country in terms of audience, with 60 million unique monthly visitors in December 2018, followed by France (48 million) and Spain (24 million).

Since 2020, Webedia has organized its activities around a "media-talents-production" triptych.

France 
Webedia's activities in France, which reach a total of 48 million unique monthly visitors, include:

 AlloCiné, a digital platform dedicated to cinema and series with more than 13 million unique monthly visitors
 FilmsActu, a YouTube channel dedicated to movie and series trailers with more than 4 million subscribers
 The Boxoffice Company, a subsidiary offering services, technologies and magazines for cinema professionals
 Boxoffice France and Le Plus, publications intended for distribution and cinematographic exhibition
 JV (ex-jeuxvideo.com), a video game news website with 6.7 million unique monthly visitors
 MGG, a website specializing in esports with 2 million unique monthly visitors
 ES1, the first French-speaking television channel 100% dedicated to esports
 JeuxActu, a website site dedicated to pop gaming culture, with 762,000 unique monthly visitors
 LeStream, a Web TV broadcast on Twitch with nearly 1 million subscribers
 ESWC, organizer of esports competitions
 750g, a website offering cooking recipes with 10.3 million unique monthly visitors
 L'Académie du Goût, a culinary website offering tips from top chefs with 1.2 million unique monthly visitors
 Alain Ducasse Edition, a publishing collection of Webedia Books specializing in the culinary field
 Purepeople, a website about celebrity news with 8 million unique monthly visitors
 Purebreak, a news platform for Millennials with 3.5 million unique monthly visitors
 Puremédias, a media news website with 2.2 million unique monthly visitors
 Purecharts, a music news website with 1.3 million unique monthly visitors
 Terrafemina, a feminist and committed news website, with 1.6 million unique monthly visitors
 Puretrend, a fashion news website with 170,000 unique monthly visitors
 Pureshopping, a fashion and decoration buying web guide
 easyVoyage, a travel comparison portal (also present in Italy, Spain, United Kingdom and Germany)
 L'officiel des vacances, a travel bargains website
 Blog creation platforms: OverBlog, CanalBlog and Eklablog
 94%, a mobile game with more than thirty million downloads
 Talent Web, label to which the videographers Cyprien, Norman, Michou, Inoxtag, Bilal Hassani, Guillaume Pley, Mamytwink Aziatomik, Sora, Dooms are affiliated
 Bang Bang Management, a label bringing together personalities from the world of sport and competitive video games such as Domingo, Gaël Monfils, or Théo Curin
 Smile Conseil, label representing in particular the personalities Just Riadh and Fatou Guinea
 Talent Web Academy, the label for micro-influencers
 Sampleo, the nano-influence activity
 Elephant, which produces the programs Sept à Huit (TF1), Invitation au voyage (Arte), C Jamy (France 5), or the series Weekend Family (Disney +), Le Tueur du Lac (TF1), La Stagiaire (France 3), Fais pas ci, Fais pas ça (France 2), WorkinGirls (Canal+)
 Nolita, who joined Elephant in 2021, and who produces feature films (Les Souvenirs, Il a déjà tes yeux, Brillantissime ...), fictions (Balle perdue on Netflix) and documentaries (Orelsan, never show this to anyone on Prime Video)
 Kiosco, which produces the shows Spectaculaire (France 2), Le Grand Oral (France 2)
 IDZ, studio specializing in the creation of fictions, clips, advertising and promotional films. He notably ensures the executive production of the French series True Story (Prime Video).

Germany 
Webedia's activities in Germany (10 million unique monthly visitors) include:

 Filmstarts, German version of Allociné
 Moviepilot, news platform on cinema and series
 GameStar, the leading video game news site in Germany (from the magazine of the same name)
 GamePro
 Mein MMO
Allyance Network, a talent label specializing in video games and pop culture, which notably represents the PietSmiet collective
 Flow: fwd, a talent label representing influencers in the themes of video games, lifestyle, humor, fitness
 Flimmer, an event production agency specializing in the movie and entertainment industries

Brazil 
Webedia's activities in Brazil reach 60 million unique monthly visitors on the following activities:

 AdoroCinema (Brazilian version of Allociné), with 12 million unique monthly visitors
 IGN Brasil, with 3.4 million unique monthly users
 MGG Brasil, site specializing in esports with 1 million unique monthly visitors
 TudoGostoso, with 15 unique monthly visitors
 Purepeople, with 4 million unique monthly visitors
 Purebreak, with 1.8 million unique monthly visitors
 Hypeness, site dedicated to innovation and creativity
 Parafernalha, a humorous channel with 12.5 million subscribers on YouTube and 5.5 million on Facebook
 Minhavida, the largest Brazilian health and wellness portal with 19 million unique monthly visitors

Spain 
Webedia España has different assets that collect 24 million unique monthly visitors:

 SensaCine (Spanish version of Allociné)
 Espinof
 3DJuegos, a video game news website
 IGN Spain
 MGG Spain
 Director al paladar
 Poprosa
 Vitonica
 Trendencias
 Decoesfera
 Compradiccion
 Motorpasion
 Xataka, the leading high-tech news website in Spain
 Applesfera
 Genbeta
 Magnet
 Vizz, a talent agency which notably represents El Rubius, Willyrex, and Vegetta777.
 Raiser Games, a video game studio which notably publishes YouTubers Life.

Mexico and Latin America 
Webedia gathers 40 million unique monthly visitors in Mexico and Latin America, on the following activities:
 SensaCine Mexico (Mexican version of Allociné) with 10 million unique monthly visitors in the area
 3DJuegos Mexico, the Mexican version of the Spanish video game news website, with 6 million unique monthly visitors in the area
 Director al paladar Mexico, with 3 million unique monthly visitors in the area
 Motorpasion Mexico, with more than 3 million unique monthly visitors in the area
 Xataka Mexico, the leading Spanish-speaking high-tech news site with more than 20 million unique monthly visitors in the area
 Vizz Latam, a talent agency which notably represents Anna Sarelly, Azttek Wolf and Isa Salas.

United States 
Webedia is present in the United States through the following activities:
 The Boxoffice Company, a subsidiary offering services, technologies and magazines for film professionals, resulting from the acquisitions of Côté Ciné Group, West World Media, Peach Digital and Film Journal International. It publishes in particular:
 BoxOffice Pro, professional film magazine created in 1920
 3BlackDot, a talent agency and influencers on YouTube and Twitch, notably representing VanossGaming
 3BlackDot, with the production of the movie Queen and Slim, and the game Dead Realm.

Turkey 
Webedia is present in Turkey around a single activity:

 Beyazperde (Turkish version of Allociné)

Middle-East 

Webedia co-owns with Five Capital (CDC International Capital) the subsidiary Webedia Arabia, a merger of its previous subsidiary Diwanee and the company Uturn Entertainment, with establishments in the United Arab Emirates, Lebanon and Saudi Arabia.

 Saudi Gamer
 MGG MENA
 Atyabtabkha
 Yasmina
 3a2ilati
 Uturn Entertainment
 Full Stop Creatives
 Made in Saudi Films

Organization 

Cédric Siré is CEO of Webedia and Véronique Morali President of the Board.

On September 17, 2015, the group inaugurated its new headquarters in Levallois-Perret in presence of Axelle Lemaire, Véronique Morali, the president of the group's management board, Marc Ladreit de Lacharrière, founder and CEO of Fimalac (parent company of Webedia) and Cédric Siré, CEO of Webedia, and its new flagship YouTubers and creators.

References

External links 

 

Companies established in 2007
Mass media companies of France
Digital media